Chloralose (also known as α-chloralose) is an avicide, and a rodenticide used to kill mice in temperatures below 15 °C.  It is also widely used in neuroscience and veterinary medicine as an anesthetic and sedative. Either alone or in combination, such as with urethane, it is used for long-lasting, but light anesthesia.

Chemically, it is a chlorinated acetal derivative of glucose.

It is listed in Annex I of Directive 67/548/EEC with the classification Harmful (Xn)

Chloralose exerts barbiturate-like actions on synaptic transmission in the brain, including potent effects at inhibitory γ-aminobutyric acid type A receptors (GABAAR).  A structural isomer of chloralose, β-chloralose (also called parachloralose in older literature), is inactive as a GABAAR modulator and also as a general anesthetic.

Chloralose is often abused for its avicide properties. In the United Kingdom, protected birds of prey have been killed using the chemical.
Legal using for bird control also often causes raptor mortalities from secondary poisoning, as well as primary poisoning of non-target species from eating bait, for example, kererū pigeon in New Zealand.

References

Acetals
Polyols
Monosaccharide derivatives
Rodenticides
Avicides
GABAA receptor positive allosteric modulators
Sedatives
General anesthetics
Trichloromethyl compounds